Achara may refer to:

 Achara Takipur, a town in Farrukhabad district in the Indian State of Uttar Pradesh
 Achara (clan), a Jat clan of Rajasthan
 Ifunanyachi Achara (born 1997), Nigerian footballer
 Kieron Achara (born 1983), Scottish basketball player
 Adjara, an autonomous republic of Georgia
 Atchara (also spelled as Atsara or Achara), pickled green papaya in Philippine cuisine
 Ācāra, a concept used in Classical Hindu law.